The 2008 Baton Rouge mayoral election was held on October 4, 2008, to elect the mayor-president of Baton Rouge, Louisiana. It saw the reelection of incumbent mayor-president Kip Holden. Since Holden won an outright majority in the first round, no runoff was necessitated.

Results

References 

2008 Louisiana elections
2008
Baton Rouge